The DeAndre Way is the third studio album by American rapper Soulja Boy. It was released on November 30, 2010, by his label Stacks on Deck Entertainment, Collipark Music and Interscope Records.

Background
At the time, Soulja Boy stated that he wished to begin working with artists such as Jay-Z and Eminem. Soulja Boy collaborated with American rappers Gucci Mane and Birdman on the track titled "Swag Flu" and also collaborated with Canadian teen pop singer Justin Bieber on the track titled "Rich Girl". Nicki Minaj, Snoop Dogg, 50 Cent, Lil Wayne, Trey Songz, Jamie Foxx, Busta Rhymes, Chris Brown, Ray J, and Arab were in works to be featured on the album, but Trey Songz, 50 Cent, and Arab were the only artists who appear on the album out of those names. SOD's rapper JBar was supposedly to be featured on the album, but did not make it the final cut. The track titled "Mean Mug", a collaboration with 50 Cent, was released on September 23.

On April 23, 2011, after the album's release, during an interview with Complex, Way stated his internal disagreements with Interscope influenced the album's disappointing record sales. Way also blamed the timing of the album.
 
Way also stated he felt helpless because of communication with Interscope was lacking, and he believed the label failed to listen to him. He claims his souring relationship with record producer and mentor Mr. Collipark, who for the first time did not do any production work on Way's album, gave him less power to negotiate with record execs.
 
Even though the two have since made up, Way stated that because of the disappointing album sales he was about to give up on his music career, but he didn't because of his other mentor 50 Cent, who was also a guest on the album, told him not to and to keep going.

Singles
"Pretty Boy Swag" was released as the album's lead single on June 8, 2010. The single has reached number 34 on the US Billboard Hot 100, number 6 on the Billboard Hot R&B/Hip-Hop Songs chart and number 5 on the Billboard Rap Songs chart. The single has gone on to sell over 1,000,000 copies. 

"Blowing Me Kisses" was released as the album's second single on August 31, 2010.

"Speakers Going Hammer" was released as the album's third single on October 19, 2010.

Other songs
A video teaser for the deluxe album song "Do It Big" was released in April 2010 to promote the album.
There are music videos for the tracks "Mean Mug" featuring 50 Cent and "30 Thousand 100 Million" feat. Lil B, both of them released in November 2010.

Critical reception

Upon release, The DeAndre Way received mixed reviews from music critics. However it has garnered better critical reception than Soulja Boy's previous albums. IGN stated "For a party-ready southern hip-hop album it gets the job done, but anyone looking for something more substantial needs to look elsewhere." Slant Magazine contributed, "The DeAndre Way doesn't exactly qualify as substantial growth, but it's another solid effort from an innovative MC who's been unfairly chastised by so many." However Rolling Stone labelled the album "bland and jaundiced", while HipHopDX states that it "lacks any evidence of creativity".

Commercial performance
The DeAndre Way sold 13,400 copies in its first week, which was a significant drop from his previous two albums. The album debuted at number 90 on the US Billboard 200 chart, number 8 on the Top Rap Albums, and number 18 on the R&B/Hip-Hop Albums charts. The album has sold 56,000 copies in the United States, making it Way's lowest selling album.

Track listing

Charts

Release history

References

2010 albums
Soulja Boy albums
Interscope Records albums
Albums produced by Boi-1da
Albums produced by Drumma Boy
Albums produced by Maejor